José Paulo dos Santos or simply Zé Paulo (born May 16, 1987 in Recife), is a Brazilian professional football player, who plays as a striker.

Club career

Sonsonate
Dos Santos signed with Sonsonate of the Salvadoran Primera División in the Apertura 2016 tournament. In January 2017, Dos Santos scored two goals in a 2–1 victory against Municipal Limeño in the Estadio Anna Mercedes Campos. With Sonsonate, Dos Santos scored 17 goals in 68 matches.

Suchitepéquez
Dos Santos signed with Suchitepéquez of Guatemala in 2017.

Isidro Metapán
In May 2018, Dos Santos signed with Isidro Metapán for the Apertura 2018. In November 2018, Dos Santos scored 2 goals against Chalatenango in a 3–1 victory in the Estadio Jorge Calero Suárez. Dos Santos scored 8 goals in 24 games at the end of the tournament.

In November 2018, Isidro Metapán reached the quarterfinals of the Apertura 2018, but they were eliminated by FAS 0–2 on aggregate.

References

1987 births
Living people
Brazilian footballers
Associação Desportiva Confiança players
Sport Club do Recife players
Association football forwards
Sportspeople from Recife